The 2013 Speedway European Championship qualification events took place from April 20 to July 6, 2013. There were four final meetings with fifteen permanent riders and one wild cards and two track reserves. The permanent riders were determined in three SEC Semifinal and one SEC Challenge.

Qualification system 
Three Semifinals were started with 48 competitors each. The top five winners advanced to the next round.

Results

References 

Speedway European Championship
2013 in speedway
Qualification for sports events